Flirting in the Air (唐伯虎衝上雲霄) is a sex comedy film directed by Aman Chang. The film was released on October 1, 2014.

Cast
 Chapman To as Captain Cool, pilot for ICE Airlines
 Dada Chan as Shelly / Shelia
 Lam Chi-chung as Sam Tong, pilot for ICE Airlines
 Dominic Ho as Guy, pilot for ICE Airlines
 Connie Man as Autumn
 Bella Lo as Spring
 Hazel Tong as Summer
 Iris Chung as Winter
 Jim Chim as Dui Tong-gai, scholar working under Duke of Ning
 Law Lan as Sister Future, a time traveler from 2014
 Jerry Koo as Boss, owner of ICE Airlines
 Monna Lam as Monica, Boss's wife who had sex with Captain Cool in the bathroom
 Ben Cheung as Tong Pak-fu, member of the Four Scholars
 Charlie Cho as Master Hua
 Lam Siu-ha as Madam Hua, wife of Master Hua
 Tony Ho as Duke of Ning
 Law Chi-man as Chok Tse-shan, member of the Four Scholars
 Duncan Cheung as Hua Man, son of Master Hua
 Shi Zhenlong as Hua Mou, son of Master Hua
 Chu Cho-keung as Ruthless Scholar, martial artist working under Duke of Ning
 Ray Pang as Hua Sau, recruiter for servants
 Huang Lu as Fan Heung, newly recruited maid
 Jolie Fan as Min Heung, newly recruited maid
 Meimei Tsang as Airline stewardess
 Diva Hui as Airline stewardess
 Lika Siu as Airline stewardess

Summary:

Airline pilots Cool (Champan To), Sam (Lam Tze Chung) and Guy (Dominic Ho) were proud womanizers who took tremendous pleasure in making rounds with every stewardess they came across. But one day during a seemingly routine flight, they encountered a violent magnetic storm that sent them falling through a wormhole. Upon landing, they assumed the storm had blown them off course onto a film set, but in reality, they had traveled back in time to Ming Dynasty.

References

Films directed by Aman Chang
Hong Kong sex comedy films
2014 films
2010s sex comedy films
2014 comedy films
2010s Hong Kong films